Peter Pan is a fictional boy who refuses to grow up, created by Scottish author J. M. Barrie and first appearing in Barrie's 1902 novel The Little White Bird.

Peter Pan may also refer to:

Featuring the character Peter Pan

"Peter Pan" can also refer to various works featuring the character (including abridgements, retellings, and other adaptations of Barrie's play or novel, not listed here):

 Peter Pan, or The Boy Who Wouldn't Grow Up (1904), the play that first popularised the character
 Peter Pan in Kensington Gardens (1906), originally a chapter in The Little White Bird about the character's origin and infancy
 Peter and Wendy (1911), the novel based on the play
 Peter Pan in Scarlet (2006), an authorised sequel
 Peter Pan (1924 film), the silent film based on the play
 Peter Pan (1950 musical), the Leonard Bernstein Broadway stage adaptation of the play, never filmed
 Peter Pan (1953 film), the animated film by The Walt Disney Company based on the play
 Peter Pan in Return to Never Land, a 2002 sequel to the 1953 film
 Peter Pan (1954 musical), the Broadway musical adaptation of the play featuring Mary Martin. Telecast live on TV twice, and afterwards videotaped for future telecasts.
 Peter Pan (1976 musical), a TV production starring Mia Farrow and Danny Kaye
 Peter Pan in Hook (film), a 1991 film starring Robin Williams as Peter and Dustin Hoffman as Captain Hook
Peter Pan (2003 film), the first live-action sound film based on the play, directed by P. J. Hogan
 Peter Pan no Boken, the anime adaptation and extension of the Peter Pan story
 Peter Pan and the Pirates, the 1990s animated TV show
 Peter Pan's Flight, a dark ride attraction at Walt Disney Parks and Resorts 
 Peter Pan (Three Sixty Entertainment), an updated version of the original play presented in its own theatre pavilion using 360 degree video
 Peter Pan Live!, a live television special and production of the 1954 musical adaptation of Peter and Wendy, broadcast on NBC in 2014
 Pan (2015 film), a prequel film by Joe Wright

Other uses

Animals
Peter Pan (American horse) (1904–1933), United States thoroughbred racehorse
Peter Pan (Australian horse) (1929–1941), Australia thoroughbred racehorse

Arts, entertainment, and media
Bands
Petar Pan, Serbian rock band
Peterpan (band), former name of Indonesian alternative pop band, now known as Noah

Record labels
Peter Pan Records, a record label of the 1950s–70s, specialising in children's records

Albums
Peter Pan (album) by Dutch rockband Peter Pan Speedrock

Songs
"Peter Pan" (Kelsea Ballerini song), 2016 song from the album The First Time
"Peter Pan", first published song by  Noël Coward, later recorded by Bessie Jones (Welsh singer) in 1918
"In Search of Peter Pan", a song by Kate Bush from the album Lionheart
"Peter Pan", a song by Exo from XOXO

Others
Peter Pan Shoukougun (Peter Pan Syndrome), a manga written by Mayu Sakai
DDT Peter Pan, an annual professional wrestling event

People associated with the name
Randy Constan, a famous Peter Pan impersonator
Peterpan, born José Fernandes de Paula, a composer

Transportation
"Peter Pan", a Kerr Stuart Wren narrow gauge locomotive belonging to the Leighton Buzzard Light Railway
Peter Pan Bus Lines, based in the northeastern United States

Various
Peter Pan (peanut butter)
Operation Peter Pan, in which children of Cuba were flown to the United States
Peter Pan syndrome, in popular psychology